Vrtiglavica, also Vrtoglavica (both from Slovene vrtoglavica 'vertigo'), is a karst shaft on the Kanin Plateau, part of the Kanin Mountains, Western Julian Alps, on the Slovene side of the border between Slovenia and Italy. The cave formed in a glaciokarst landscape; that is, a karst landscape that was subjected to Pleistocene glacial activity.

It was discovered in the summer of 1996 by Italian speleologists and the bottom was reached on October 12, 1996, by a joint Slovene–Italian expedition.

References

Caves of the Slovene Littoral
Julian Alps
Karst caves
Subterranean waterfalls